Fort Orange (Dutch: Fort Oranje) was built as a trading post on the Dutch Gold Coast in 1642, near Sekondi in the Western Region of Ghana. It functioned as a lodge for a while during the 1670s and that was the original purpose for the fort before it was used as a trading post. The trading post was enlarged into a fort in 1690. It was joined by an English Fort Sekondi in 1682. It was sold with the rest of the Dutch Gold Coast to the United Kingdom in 1872, and now serves as a lighthouse. Because of its historical importance in trade between Europe and Africa, Fort Orange was inscribed on the UNESCO World Heritage List in 1979 along with several other castles and forts in Ghana.

History 
Fort Orange was first constructed by the Dutch to serve as a lodge in the 1670s. It suffered attacks prominent among which was one by the Ahantas in September 1694. After these attacks, the fort was remodeled to become a fortress by 1704. Prior to this however, it served as a trading post.

Current Situation 
Fort Orange used to serve as a lookout post but currently serves as a naval base for the Ghana Ports and Harbor Authority.

References 

Buildings and structures completed in 1642
Buildings and structures completed in 1690
History of Ghana
Castles in Ghana
Dutch Gold Coast
1642 establishments in the Dutch Empire
Orange
Sekondi Takoradi Metropolitan Assembly